Laxmi Narayan Bhanja Deo (25 July 1912 – 9 July 1986) was an Indian politician. He was elected to the Lok Sabha, lower house of the Parliament of India from Keonjhar in Odisha as a member of the Indian National Congress.

Dei died on 9 July 1986, at the age of 73.

References

External links
Official Biographical Sketch in Lok Sabha Website

1912 births
1986 deaths
India MPs 1957–1962
India MPs 1962–1967
Lok Sabha members from Odisha